Moyle may refer to:

Places
Moyle District Council, a former local authority in County Antrim, Northern Ireland
Moyle River, Northern Territory, Australia
Straits of Moyle, the sea between northeastern Northern Ireland southwestern Scotland

Other uses
Moyle horse, a rare breed of horse
HVDC Moyle, an electrical interconnector between Scotland and Northern Ireland

See also

Moyles (disambiguation)
Moyle (surname)
Mohel